The three-toed earless skink (Hemiergis decresiensis) is a viviparous earless skink from southeastern Australia.

Description
Hemiergis decresiensis is a thin, smooth-scaled lizard with short legs, a movable, transparent lower eyelid and no visible ear opening. It is a burrowing species with only three small toes on each limb. The upper surface is a rich brown colour with a few dark brown stripes or spots. Its sides are greyish brown with darker spots and there is a narrow dark brown line along the side of the head and through the eye. It lays several oval-shaped eggs that hatch only a few days later.

References

Hemiergis
Skinks of Australia
Endemic fauna of Australia
Taxa named by Georges Cuvier
Reptiles described in 1829